The 2019 Nippon Professional Baseball season began on March 29. It was the 70th season since Nippon Professional Baseball (NPB) was reorganized in 1950. There are 12 teams NPB, split evenly between the Central League and Pacific League. The 2019 NPB season was 143 games long; teams in each league played 125 games against each other and 18 interleague games. The regular season was scheduled to end on September 24 except for any make-up games scheduled after it; the regular season eventually concluded on September 30. The top three teams in each league proceed to the Climax Series, NPB's postseason system.

Regular season standings

Climax Series

First stage

Central League

Pacific League

Final Stage

Central League

Pacific League

Japan Series

League leaders

Central League

Pacific League

Awards

Regular season

Monthly MVPs

See also
2019 KBO League season
2019 Major League Baseball season

References

 
Nippon Professional Baseball season
Nippon Professional Baseball season